Amédée-François-Paul de Béjarry (1770 - 1844) was a French politician. He served as a member of the Chamber of Deputies from 1816 to 1818, representing Vendée.

References

1770 births
1844 deaths
People from Vendée
Members of the Chamber of Deputies of the Bourbon Restoration